Ovini Uera (born 18 January 1988) is a Nauruan judoka.

Preparation
Uera, who was a catering manager and worked for Nauru Airlines, had a daily routine that started with a warm up at 6am, and practiced at a gym with no walls, and had rain falling through the roof.Sled Dowabobo was the coach and physiotherapist for him. Uera raised funds from barbecues and door knocking. He studied YouTube videos of Varlam Liparteliani. In a recorded interview with him from the 2016 Rio olympics,

Career
He competed at the 2016 Summer Olympics in Rio de Janeiro, in the men's 90 kg where he defeated Renick James in the second round but lost to Varlam Liparteliani in the third round. He was the flag bearer for Nauru during the closing ceremony.

References

External links
 
Short recorded interview with BBC in Rio in 2016

1988 births
Living people
Nauruan male judoka
Olympic judoka of Nauru
Judoka at the 2016 Summer Olympics